South East Delhi is an administrative district of the National Capital Territory of Delhi in India.

This district was carved out in 2012 along with Shahdara, taking the total number to 11 administrative districts in Delhi.

Geography
The South East Delhi district is bordered in west by South Delhi district, in south by the Faridabad district of Haryana, in east by River Yamuna, and by New Delhi district and East Delhi district in north-west and north-east respectively.

The district stretches from Jor Bagh, Lodhi Road, Khan Market, Sunder Nagar, Nizamuddin East, Nizamuddin West, Sarai Kale Khan, through Defence Colony, Lajpat Nagar, New Friends Colony, Nehru Place, Kalkaji, Chittaranjan Park, Govindpuri, Greater Kailash, Alaknanda to Jamia Nagar, Okhla, Sarita Vihar, Jaitpur and Badarpur.

Administration
Administratively, the district is divided into three subdivisions, Defence Colony, Kalkaji and Sarita Vihar. Defence Colony is the administrative headquarters of the district.

Demographics
Since the district was created after the latest Census of India was completed in 2011, independent statistics for South East Delhi is not available yet.

References

 
Districts of Delhi